Tetraspanin 14 is a protein that in humans is encoded by the TSPAN14 gene.

References

Further reading